Ożanna  (Ozhanna) is a village in the administrative district of Gmina Kuryłówka, within Leżajsk County, Subcarpathian Voivodeship, in south-eastern Poland.

The Złota river flows through the village. A small reservoir (Zalew Ożanna) has been created on the river which is surrounded by tourist accommodation and a camping site.

The village has a population of 350.

Notable persons
Moe Drabowsky, American Major League baseball player, fled with his family as Hitler came to power

References

Villages in Leżajsk County